The 1979 Men's Junior World Handball Championship was the second edition of the IHF Men's Junior World Championship, held in Denmark and Sweden from 23 October to 2 November 1979.

Preliminary round

Group A

Group B

Group C

Group D

Main round
All points and goals against the team from the same preliminary round were carried over.

17th–23rd place classification

Group V

Group VI

9–16th place classification

Group III

Group IV

1st–8th place classification

Group I

Group II

Placement games

21st place game

19th place game

17th place game

15th place game

173th place game

Eleventh place game

Ninth place game

Seventh place game

Fifth place game

Third place game

Final

Final ranking

External links
IHF report
Results on todor66.com

1979 Junior
Men's Junior World Handball Championship
International handball competitions hosted by Denmark
International handball competitions hosted by Sweden
1979 in Danish sport
1979 in Swedish sport
October 1979 sports events in Europe
November 1979 sports events in Europe